Borsodi or Borsody can refer to:
A resident of Borsod, Hungary, now part of Borsod-Abaúj-Zemplén county
Borsodi beer, the flagship product of Borsod Brewery in Hungary
Borsodi Liga, the nickname of the Hungarian League from 2005 to 2007, when it was sponsored by the brewery

Surname 
Ralph Borsodi (1886–1977), American agrarian theorist 
Béla Bevilaqua-Borsodi (1885–1962), Hungarian cultural historian
Eduard von Borsody (1898–1970),  Austrian cameraman, film editor, film director and screenplay writer
Hans von Borsody (1929–2013), German filmmaker
Julius von Borsody (1892–1960), Austrian film architect 
Suzanne von Borsody (born 1957), German actress